Mohamed El-Arabi Serghini (Arabic: محمد العربي السرغيني) is a Moroccan classical singer and musician. He has performed with Aouatif Bouamar, with Eduardo Paniagua, Said Belcadi and Omar Metioui. He trained at the Tangier Conservatory (المعهد الموسيقي بطنجة), and sings with the Tangier Orchestra (اوركسترا طنجة).

Selected discography
 Almuedano - Mohammed Berraq, El Arabi Serghini, Azzedine al Badri, Muhamad Zugir, Hassan Ajyar, Said Belcadi. Pneuma CD
 La Felicidad Cumplida El Arabi Serghini, 2006
 La Bellezza Contemplada - Musica Andalusí de Laúd Larbí Akrim, El Arabí Serghini

References

21st-century Moroccan male singers
Living people
People from Tangier
Year of birth missing (living people)